The councils of Saragossa (Latin: Concilia Caesaraugustana) were a series of Christian councils held in Zaragoza, in what is now Spain.

In or about 380 a council of Spanish and Aquitanian bishops adopted at Saragossa eight canons bearing more or less directly on the prevalent heresy of Priscillianism. A second council, held by Maximus of Zaragoza in 592, solved practical problems incident to the recent conversion of the West Goths from Arianism to Chalcedonian Christianity. The third council, in 691, issued five canons on discipline.

In 1318 a provincial synod proclaimed the elevation of Zaragoza to the rank of an archbishopric; and from September 1565 to February 1566 a similar synod made known the decrees of the Council of Trent.

References

H. T. Bruns, Canones apostolorum et conciliorum saeculorum iv., v., vi., vii., pars altera (Berlin, 1839)
Pius Bonifacius Gams, Die Kirchengeschichte von Spanien (Regensburg, 1862-1879).

380
380s in the Roman Empire
4th century in Hispania
592
6th century in the Visigothic Kingdom
691
7th century in the Visigothic Kingdom
1565 in Christianity
1565 in Spain
1566 in Christianity
1566 in Spain
Catholic Church councils held in Spain
4th-century church councils
6th-century church councils
7th-century church councils
14th-century Catholic Church councils
16th-century Catholic Church councils
Councils
Ancient Christian controversies
Priscillianism
Spain in the Roman era